The Swedish Ambassador in Pyongyang is the official representative of the Government in Stockholm to the Government of North Korea the (People's Republic of Korea). Sweden is the protecting power of United States interests in North Korea.
Until 2001, Sweden was the only western state with unbroken diplomatic representation in the city. The Swedish embassy has consular representation for Australia, Canada and the Nordic countries.

List of representatives

References 

 
Korea  North
Sweden